In the mathematical field of descriptive set theory, a subset  of a Polish space  is projective if it is  for some positive integer .  Here  is
  if  is analytic
  if there is a Polish space  and a  subset  such that  is the projection of  onto ; that is, 

The choice of the Polish space  in the third clause above is not very important; it could be replaced in the definition by a fixed uncountable Polish space, say Baire space or Cantor space or the real line.

Relationship to the analytical hierarchy 

There is a close relationship between the relativized analytical hierarchy on subsets of Baire space (denoted by lightface letters  and ) and the projective hierarchy on subsets of Baire space (denoted by boldface letters  and ). A similar statement holds for  sets. Thus the sets classified by the projective hierarchy are exactly the sets classified by the relativized version of the analytical hierarchy. This relationship is important in effective descriptive set theory.

A similar relationship between the projective hierarchy and the relativized analytical hierarchy holds for subsets of Cantor space and, more generally, subsets of any effective Polish space.

Table

References 
 
 

Descriptive set theory
Mathematical logic hierarchies